Sana Dalawa ang Puso Ko is a 1994 Philippine drama film co-written and directed by Laurice Guillen. The film stars Dina Bonnevie, Alice Dixson and Rustom Padilla. It is named after Bodjie's Law of Gravity's hit song from their 1992 album Kamandag.

Cast
 Dina Bonnevie as Susan
 Alice Dixson as Isabel
 Rustom Padilla as Gabriel
 Tonton Gutierrez as Dan
 Raquel Pareño as Sandy
 Mandy Ochoa as Manny
 Gloria Romero as Rose
 Charito Solis as Emily
 Romeo Rivera as Isabel's Father
 Pocholo Montes as Dr. Soler
 Ernie Zarate as Judge
 Marissa De Guzman as Minda

Production
The film began production in 1993 with Dina Bonnevie, Nanette Medved and Cesar Montano originally part of the cast and Danny Zialcita initially at the helm. However, halfway through production, Nanette and Cesar backed out, with the former due to scheduling conflicts and the latter choosing to work on Alyas Waway, and Danny was taken ill. As a result, the film was shelved.

In April the following year, production of the film was revived, this time with Laurice Guillen at the helm and Alice Dixson and Rustom Padilla taking over the roles of Nanette and Cesar respectively. At one point, Laurice was hospitalized, putting production on hold for a couple of weeks.

Awards

References

External links

1994 films
1994 action films
Filipino-language films
Philippine drama films
Viva Films films
GMA Pictures films
Films directed by Laurice Guillen